HMS K14 was a K class submarine built by Fairfields in Govan, Scotland. She was laid down in November 1915, and commissioned on 22 May 1917.

K14 was part of the Battle of May Island exercise on 31 January 1918, in which her steering jammed while avoiding a collision. She was rammed by  behind the forward torpedo compartment, but did not sink, and was repaired. Two men were lost. K14 was sold on 16 February 1926 at Granton.

Design
K14 displaced  when at the surface and  while submerged. The submarine was powered by two oil-fired Yarrow Shipbuilders boilers each supplying one geared Brown-Curtis or Parsons steam turbine; this developed 10,500 ship horsepower (7,800 kW) to drive two  screws. Submerged power came from four electric motors each producing . It was also had an  diesel engine to be used when steam was being raised, or instead of raising steam.

K14 was armed with ten  torpedo tubes, two  deck guns, and a  anti-aircraft gun. The torpedo tubes were mounted in the bows, the midship section firing to the beam, and two were on a rotating mounting on the deck. Its complement was fifty-nine crew members.

References

Bibliography
 

 

British K-class submarines
Ships built in Govan
1917 ships
Royal Navy ship names